Arnica gracilis is a North American species of flowering plant in the family Asteraceae, known by the common name smallhead arnica. It is native to western Canada (Alberta, British Columbia) and the northwestern United States (Washington, Oregon, Idaho, Montana, Wyoming, north-central Colorado (Jackson County), and northern Utah (Cache, Summit, + Daggett Counties).

Arnica gracilis is an herb up to 30 cm (12 inches) tall. Flower heads are yellow, with both ray florets and disc florets.

References

External links
Paul Slichter, The Arnicas of Mt. Adams (Washington State), Slender Arnica, Mountain Arnica  Arnica gracilis
Eastern Washington University, Flora of Eastern Washington and Adjacent Idaho

gracilis
Flora of Western Canada
Plants described in 1897
Flora of the Northwestern United States
Flora of Utah
Flora without expected TNC conservation status